Mariscal Castilla District (Spanish mariscal marshal) is one of fifteen districts of the province Concepción in Peru.

References